Prateek Sharma FACG, FACP, FASGE is an Indian American gastroenterologist that specializes in esophageal diseases and endoscopic treatments.

Early life and career
Sharma was born in Chandigarh, India. He graduated with a MBBS from M.S. University of Baroda in 1991 and from the University of Louisville School of Medicine in 1992. He completed his residency at the Medical College of Wisconsin in Milwaukee in 1995 and his Gastroenterology Fellowship at the University of Arizona in Tucson in 1997.

He is a Professor of Medicine and Program Director of the Gastroenterology Fellowship Program at University of Kansas School of Medicine and the section chief of Gastroenterology at the Kansas City Veterans Affairs Medical Center.

Sharma is a Fellow of the American College of Physicians.

Scientific work 
Sharma's focus lies in improving the diagnosis and management of GI diseases and cancer, specifically in esophageal diseases, Gastroesophageal reflux disease (GERD), Barrett’s esophagus, advanced imaging, and endoscopic treatments.

Awards and honours 
2014 - American Society of Gastrointestinal Endoscopy Crystal Award recipient for Distinguished Endoscopic Research Mentoring.

Publications 

 Sharma, P., Dent, J., Armstrong, D., Bergman, J. J., Gossner, L., Hoshihara, Y., ... & Vieth, M. (2006). The development and validation of an endoscopic grading system for Barrett’s esophagus: the Prague C & M criteria. Gastroenterology, 131(5), 1392-1399 (241 citations).
 Sharma, P. (2009). Barrett's esophagus. New England journal of medicine, 361(26), 2548-2556 (181 citations).
 Sharma, P., Falk, G. W., Weston, A. P., Reker, D., Johnston, M., & Sampliner, R. E. (2006). Dysplasia and cancer in a large multicenter cohort of patients with Barrett’s esophagus. Clinical Gastroenterology and Hepatology, 4(5), 566-572 (102 citations).
Sharma, P., Bansal, A., Mathur, S., Wani, S., Cherian, R., McGregor, D., ... & Weston, A. (2006). The utility of a novel narrow band imaging endoscopy system in patients with Barrett's esophagus. Gastrointestinal endoscopy, 64(2), 167-175 (84 citations).
 Sharma, P., Weston, A. P., Topalovski, M., Cherian, R., Bhattacharyya, A., & Sampliner, R. E. (2003). Magnification chromoendoscopy for the detection of intestinal metaplasia and dysplasia in Barrett’s oesophagus. Gut, 52(1), 24-27 (62 citations).

References

External links 
Scopus Author ID

Living people
Indian emigrants to the United States
People from Chandigarh
Maharaja Sayajirao University of Baroda alumni
American gastroenterologists
Indian gastroenterologists
University of Louisville School of Medicine alumni
Year of birth missing (living people)